Marco Vinicius Constante (born October 4, 1967 in Saquisilí) is a former Ecuadorian football midfielder. He played during the majority of his career for El Nacional.

External links

1967 births
Living people
People from Saquisilí
Association football midfielders
Ecuadorian footballers
Ecuador international footballers
1997 Copa América players
C.D. El Nacional footballers
S.D. Quito footballers